Sidy is a male given name. Notable people with this name include:

 Cheikh Sidy Ba (born 1968), Senegalese football player
 Sidy Diagne (born 2002), football player
 Sidy Fassara Diabaté (born 1950), Malian film director
 Sidy Keita (born 1987), Senegalese football player
 Sidy Koné (born 1992), Malian football player
 Sidy Lamine Niasse (1950–2018), Senegalese lawyer, teacher, journalist, and religious guide
 Sidy Sagna (born 1990), Senegalese football player
 Sidy Sandy (born 1974), Guinean boxer
 Sidy Sanokho (born 1997), French football player
 Sidy Sarr (born 1996), Senegalese football player